Gar Ryness, also known by his stage name as Batting Stance Guy, is an American sports entertainer and YouTube personality. He performs impressions of the batting stances of Major League Baseball players. He can mimic the batting stances of the starting line-ups of all 30 MLB teams.

Personal life 

Ryness grew up in the San Francisco Bay Area and graduated from Monte Vista High School in Danville in 1991. He is married and has two children. Before landing a deal with Fox Sports Net, he worked for a nonprofit Christian organization as a spiritual advisor to professionals in the entertainment industry. He is a graduate of Syracuse University.

Ryness stated that he first realized his talent at age seven when he was playing wiffle ball in his backyard. He said he never stopped imitating the pros and simply loves baseball. Ryness claims that he only has to watch a hitter a few times before he can perfectly imitate their stance: He picks up the tiniest details and exaggerates them so that people notice them more. He said he loves traveling around the country and bringing nostalgia to the fans and players.

TV appearances and radio broadcasts

 May 23, 2008: First blog mention on BallHype.com: Q&A with the Batting Stance Guy
 May 2008: Dan Patrick mentions BSG and his "unmarketable" skill on his Sirius XM radio show
 June 2008: Bill Simmons of ESPN.com gives BSG the honor of "YouTube Star of the Week"
 August 2008: Brewers Live (FSN North WI): BSG on Brewers Live
 August 2008: Twins Live (FSN North MN): BSG on Twins Live
 September 10, 2008: Padres Pregame Show (Cox Media SD): BSG on Padres Pregame show
 September 2008: Angels Live (FSN West): BSG on Angels Live
 September 2008: Dodgers Live (FSN Prime Ticket): BSG on Dodgers Live
 November 2008: Sony Entertainment records his stance imitations for MLB 2009: The Show
 April 15, 2009: ESPN's E:60: "Art of the Stance"
 May 6, 2009: The Associated Press: "BSG and Manny Ramirez"
 May 19, 2009: The Associated Press: "Rise of the BSG"
 June 17, 2009: ESPN's Baseball Tonight BSG on Baseball tonight
 July 13, 2009: CBS's Late Show with David Letterman: Second guest segment

References 

Living people
1973 births
Major League Baseball on television